Placido Campolo (1693–1743) was an Italian painter of the late-Baroque period, a native of Messina in Sicily. In Rome, he was the pupil of the painter Sebastiano Conca; in 1731, he returned to Messina to paint the Galleria del Senato. He died of plague in 1743.

He painted for the cathedral and the church of Sant'Angelo de Rossi (Defeat of the Fallen Angels). He also helped to design the entrances and steps to the church of Monte di Pieta degli Azzurri.

Campolo has an entry in the Benezit Dictionary of Artists.

References

1693 births
1743 deaths
Painters from Messina
18th-century Italian painters
Italian male painters
Italian Baroque painters
18th-century deaths from plague (disease)
18th-century Italian male artists